The Budgewoi Lake, a lagoon that is part of the Tuggerah Lakes, is located within the Central Coast Council local government area in the Central Coast region of New South Wales, Australia.

Features and location
Drawing its catchment from a small creek and the southern half of Lake Munmorah, Budgewoi Lake is located north of Wallarah Point and is bounded by Toukley, Budgewoi, Buff Point, Charmhaven and Gorokan. To the south of the lake, the Tuggerah Lake drains excess water, that flows to the Tasman Sea of the South Pacific Ocean, via The Entrance.

See also

 List of lakes of Australia

References

External links
 

Lakes of New South Wales
Central Coast (New South Wales)
Important Bird Areas of New South Wales
Central Coast Council (New South Wales)